Count Luigi Vannutelli Rey was an Italian diplomat. He was Ambassador in Prague from 1928–1930, Ambassador in Warsaw from 1931–1932 and Ambassador in Brussels from 1932–1939.

References

Year of birth missing
Year of death missing
Ambassadors of Italy to Poland
Ambassadors of Italy to Czechoslovakia
Ambassadors of Italy to Belgium